Postia sericeomollis is a species of fungus belonging to the family Dacryobolaceae.

Synonym:
 Oligoporus sericeomollis (Romell) Bondartseva, 1983

References

Fomitopsidaceae